Carol Henry (July 14, 1918 – September 17, 1987) was an American character actor who played the parts of henchmen in Western films and television series throughout the 1940s, 1950s and 1960s. He also served as a stunt man in various films although all his work in that field went uncredited. 

Born in Oklahoma, he appeared in an episode of Sergeant Preston of the Yukon in 1955 as McClain, a murderer. In 1958 he appeared as a posse member in the TV western Tales of Wells Fargo in the episode titled "Butch Cassidy." 

Carol Henry died in North Hollywood, aged 69.

Selected filmography
 Gun Talk (1947)
 Courtin' Trouble (1948)
 Gunning for Justice (1948)
 The Sheriff of Medicine Bow (1948)
 Across the Rio Grande (1949)
 Gun Law Justice (1949)
 Trails End (1949)
 Roll, Thunder, Roll! (1949)
 Range Land (1949)
 Outlaw Gold (1950)
 Gunslingers (1950)
 The Longhorn (1951)

References

1918 births
1987 deaths
Actors from Oklahoma
American male film actors
American male television actors
20th-century American male actors
Western (genre) television actors
Male Western (genre) film actors
American stunt performers